Anurag Sarangi (born 17 December 1992) is an Indian cricketer who plays for Odisha. Sarangi made his first-class debut in 2014 against Maharashtra. He made his List A debut on 3 March 2014, for Maharashtra in the 2013–14 Vijay Hazare Trophy.

References

External links
 

1992 births
Living people
Indian cricketers
Odisha cricketers
Sportspeople from Bhubaneswar
Cricketers from Odisha